The Sjoa is a river in Innlandet county, Norway. The river flows eastward through the Sjodalen valley and Heidal valley into the Gudbrandsdalslågen river at the village of Sjoa.

South of the village of Randsverk, the river flows through Ridderspranget which is a ravine named after a Norwegian myth.

Rafting, kayaking and fishing
The river is used for kayaking, rafting and fishing. Thirteen deaths have occurred in the river, from 1989 to 2010.

There are several companies offering rafting, kayaking, riverboarding and other activities in Sjoa and the surrounding area. Some parts of the river are impossible to raft. Some parts are blocked by large rocks which the river flows underneath. These areas are considered "death traps" by the local commercial rafting providers.

References

External links
Sjoa Raftingsenter NWR Rafting and riverboarding in the Sjoa area.
Heidal Rafting White Water River Adventures in the Sjoa River in Norway
Sjoa Rafting White Water River Adventures in Norway.
GoRafting.no White Water River Adventures in the Sjoa River
Sjoafestivalen Festival in and by Sjoa

Vågå
Sel
Rivers of Innlandet